This is a list of National Football League (NFL) players who had outstanding performances throughout the 1960s and have been compiled together into this fantasy group. The team was selected by voters of the Pro Football Hall of Fame at the end of the decade.

Players

References 

National Football League All-Decade Teams
National Football League records and achievements
1960s in sports
Foot
Foot
National Football League lists